The 1904–05 Manitoba Hockey Association (MHA) season  was won by the Rat Portage Thistles. After the season the Thistles challenged Ottawa for the Stanley Cup, but lost in a three-game series.

Regular season

Highlights
Tom Phillips returned to the Thistles after attending McGill University and a year in Toronto. Phillips brought along goaltender Eddie Giroux, with whom he had played with in the 1903–04 season for the Toronto Marlboros.

Final standing

Source: Zweig, 2012.

Stanley Cup Challenges

After the season, the Thistles challenged the Ottawa Hockey Club in Ottawa

Rat Portage vs. Ottawa

In March 1905, the Rat Portage Thistles issued another challenge to the Senators. The Ottawa star Frank McGee did not play in the first game and the Thistles crushed Ottawa, 9–3. However, he returned to lead the  Senators to 4–2 and 5–4 victories in games two and three, respectively. McGee scored the winning goal in the third game.

See also
 List of Stanley Cup champions

References

 

Manitoba Hockey Association seasons
Man